Lake Küti is a lake in Estonia.

See also
List of lakes of Estonia

Kuti